Charles Raymond Dyer (7 July 1928 – 23 January 2021) was an English playwright, actor and screenwriter.

Life and career 
His first appearance was in 1948, at the Whitehall Theatre. His first play "Who On Earth", was published in 1953.

He died in January 2021 at the age of 92.

Theatre 
1948: Clubs Are Sometimes Trumps
1951: Who on Earth?
1953: Turtle in the Soup
1954: Jovial Parasite
1955: Single Ticket to Mars
1956: Wanted, One Body!
1956: Time, Murderer, Please
1957: Poison in Jest
1959: Prelude to Fury
1960: Red Cabbage and Kings
1962: La Crécelle (Rattle of a Simple Man)
1964: Gorillas Drink Milk
1966: L'Escalier (Staircase), an adaptation of which in France will inspire Jean Poiret, La Cage aux Folles, in a comic version
1971: Mother Adam
1975: A Hot Godly Wind
1980: Futility Rites
1983: Lovers Dancing

Filmography 
Scriptwriter
 1964: Rattle of a Simple Man from Muriel Box
 1969: The Staircase (Staircase) by Stanley Donen, adapted from his own play by theater above, and therefore at the origin of the comedy La Cage aux folles by Jean Poiret
 1974: La Crécelle (TV) by Roger Kahane

Actor
 1964: Rattle of a Simple Man from Muriel Box: Chalky
 1964: A Christmas Night with the Stars (TV)
 1965: The Knack ... and how to get it (The Knack ... and How to Get It) by Richard Lester: The man in the photo booth
 1967: How I won the war (How I Won the War) by Richard Lester: The man in the pants

References

External links 

 
 The Playwrights Database 

1928 births
2021 deaths
20th-century British dramatists and playwrights
English male film actors
English screenwriters
Writers from Shrewsbury
Actors from Shrewsbury